Michael Georgiou (born 18 January 1988) is a British-Cypriot former professional snooker player from Forest Hill. He is a practice partner of Igor Figueiredo and Hammad Miah, who practises at Whetstone Snooker Club.

In 2018, Georgiou won his first professional ranking title by defeating Graeme Dott in the final of the Snooker Shoot-Out.

Michael Georgiou made the 140th official maximum break in the third frame of the last 128 match against Umut Dikme at the 2018 Paul Hunter Classic. It was Michael's first professional maximum break.

In 2019 he became the first Cypriot player to qualify for the World Snooker Championship in Sheffield defeating Lee Walker 10–7, Peter Ebdon 10–8 and Yan Bingtao 10–8 in the 3 qualifying rounds to make his Crucible debut.

Career
Georgiou qualified for the main tour by winning the 2007 IBSF World Under-21 Snooker Championship in India. However it was a season to forget as he failed to win a single match and lost his tour place as a result.

Georgiou spent the next two seasons competing in the PIOS series then decided to give up snooker and started a career in recruitment. He commented: "I was doing a 9-to-5 job, sitting behind a desk. But I always kept an eye on snooker and when I saw how the sport had changed and the opportunities that are there now, I decided to give it another try". Georgiou returned to serious action in 2013 as he entered the Q School, his best run coming at the second event where he defeated Dessie Sheehan and Darren Bond, before losing to eventual qualifier Ahmed Saif. Georgiou continued to enter European Tour events as an amateur during the 2013/14 season, while also participating in the EBSA Qualifying Tour where he reached final of one of the tournaments to qualify for the play-offs. There Georgiou was beaten to the two-year tour card by Zak Surety; however he was more successful in the Q School where, after losing early in Event 1, he went all the way in Event 2 by defeating Adam Wicheard, Gareth Green, Sean O'Sullivan, Jordan Brown and in the final round Ashley Carty to confirm his return to the main tour for the 2014–15 and 2015–16 seasons.

Georgiou started his comeback season in the best possible way as he whitewashed Aditya Mehta 5–0 to qualify for the venue stages of the 2014 Wuxi Classic, where he beat Marcus Campbell 5–2, before losing 5–3 to Neil Robertson. Anthony McGill eliminated him 6–4 in the first round of the UK Championship, but Georgiou then overcame 2006 world champion Graeme Dott 5–1 and Andrew Pagett 5–3 in qualifying for the German Masters. He lost 5–3 against Alfie Burden. Georgiou's best form came at the Welsh Open where he defeated Peter Lines 4–1, Lee Walker 4–2 and Dott 4–3 to reach the last 16 of a ranking event for the first time. However, he suffered a 4–2 defeat to four-time world champion John Higgins.

Georgiou made his debut in the Australian Goldfields Open by beating Ross Muir 5–0, Aditya Mehta 5–4 and David Gilbert 5–4, but lost 5–2 to John Higgins in the first round. Before the UK Championship he had been practicing with seven-time world champion Stephen Hendry and knocked out David Morris 6–5 in the opening round. He was defeated 6–2 by Mark Allen in the second round. Gergiou reached the third round of the Welsh Open by overcoming Jamie Jones 4–0 and Peter Ebdon 4–2, but lost 4–1 to Higgins for the second year in a row. He needed to qualify for the World Championship to remain on tour, but lost his opening game 10–6 to Noppon Saengkham meaning he needed to come through Q School to earn his place back.

In 2016, Georgiou announced that he would be representing Cyprus at the 2016/17 Q School tournaments. Georgiou was successful in the second event in regaining his tour place defeating Craig Steadman 4–1 in the final round and as a result would qualify for the tour as a Cypriot player. He got to the third round of the Paul Hunter Classic courtesy of beating Fraser Patrick 4–1 and David Gilbert 4–2 and lost 4–1 to Gerard Greene. Georgiou secured 6–2 and 6–4 wins over Matthew Selt and Mike Dunn to set up a third round encounter with Ronnie O'Sullivan at the UK Championship. Georgiou took the opening frame, but would go on to lose 6–1 and described his opponent as not human after the match such was his standard of play. He had a fourth round showing at the Shoot-Out and was eliminated by Andy Hicks.
Georgiou moved out of London to Northern Ireland for a different pace of life and to be around fellow pro's Jordan Brown and Mark Allen, however results didn't follow and after a second round defeat to Jimmy White in qualifying for the delayed 2020 World Snooker Championship saw his ranking drop low enough for him to be off the professional tour.

Performance and rankings timeline

Career finals

Ranking finals: 1 (1 title)

Pro-am finals: 3 (2 titles)

Amateur finals: 1 (1 title)

References

External links

 
Michael Georgiou at worldsnooker.com

1988 births
Living people
Snooker players from London
Cypriot snooker players
People from Forest Hill, London
English people of Greek Cypriot descent